KSDB-FM is Kansas State University's campus radio station. A non-commercial radio station located in Manhattan, Kansas, broadcasting on 91.9 MHz on the FM dial, KSDB is staffed by about 100 student volunteers who gain valuable experience in all areas of radio broadcasting.  It plays alternative/independent rock, hip hop, and jazz and is under the jurisdiction of the A.Q. Miller School of Journalism and Mass Communications.

The station has been broadcasting on the FM band since spring of 1950, and from its current location in the K-State Student Union since 2002.  Previously, the station broadcast on the campus carrier current AM system, and had studios located in Nichols Gymnasium.  When Nichols burned down in 1968, KSDB operated from temporary locations until McCain Auditorium was completed. The station still maintains studios and offices there.

History

Early years 
KSDB began as an experiment on the third floor of Nichols Gymnasium in 1949. The first broadcasts began in earnest in March, but KSDB was a commercial station by June. KSDB's commercial status allowed it to be self-supporting. Instead of a tower, the station broadcast over the campus power system. Broadcasting as a wired-wireless (or carrier current) station meant the signals never went more than a few hundred feet from power lines. This was within the maximum distance allowed by the Federal Communications Commission (FCC). At this time, the station was a member of the Intercollegiate Broadcasting System and under the direction of the Speech Department and Prof. George L. Arms.

KSDB initially broadcast at 560 kHz. At this frequency, “practically the only way to hear the station was to sit on the steps of Nichols gym with a portable radio.” The station switched to 660  in December, 1949, which “resulted in a marked improvement in reception.”

Programming for KSDB in the first year went from an hour of music at first, to about four hours of music, talk, and sports by November 2, 1949. The schedules for KSDB and KSAC were printed in the Kansas State Collegian. KSDB was on the air for 6 hours each weekday by November 20, 1950.

A television workshop established in 1948 gave radio-television students experience in another medium. Programs could be televised into two TV classrooms in Nichols Gymnasium.

On March 14, 1949, KSDB went on the air as a wired-wireless (carrier current) AM station, originally at 560 kHz; in December, it changed frequency to 660 kHz. The station became an FM outlet on April 2, 1951, broadcasting with 10 watts at 88.1 MHz, thanks to a transmitter donated by Senator Arthur Capper. Wendall Wilson was the first K-State student to broadcast on KSDB.

The Nichols fire

On Friday 13 December 1968, Nichols Gymnasium was burned by arsonists. The fire "completely wiped out" KSDB, along with the Music Department and Physical Education. The only piece of music to survive the fire was the Wabash Cannonball, which became one of K-State's main fight songs.  The KSDB disc jockey on the air reportedly said "Due to circumstances beyond our control, we are leaving the air early."

For KSDB, the loss was tremendous. The December 16 Kansas State Collegian quoted then-station manager Kenneth Mroziniski as saying, "We lost a brand new Gage transmitter, Gage board console, New Producer console, two new turntables and two tape recorders." Virginia Howe was head of radio and television at the time. "A writer for the radio version of The Lone Ranger, she lost a near lifetime of documents and records." Lowell Jack was station manager at KMAN-AM and came to KSDB's rescue.

Later that year KSDB moved into the fifth floor of Farrell Library (now Hale Library).  The space was provided by Professor Richard Farley, administrator of the library. The 1971 Royal Purple yearbook indicates KSDB was using $70,000 worth of new equipment purchased since April, 1970. The quiet atmosphere of the library was in stark contrast to the bustling radio station. In addition, low ceilings hampered the ability of the television workshop to provide adequate lighting for scenes. KSDB continued to exist in this location until students heard of the planned expansion of the auditorium (to be renamed McCain Auditorium) and lobbied for space. In 1976, KSDB moved into the third floor of McCain Auditorium.

In 1988 the KMAN-AM/KMKF-FM (Manhattan Broadcasting Company) studios on Casement Road caught fire. Representatives from KSDB offered studio space, and KMKF-FM was back on the air in only 12 hours. KMAN-AM took longer to get back on the air. According to Lowell Jack, "They made the offer before firemen had the fire under control." Manhattan Broadcasting employees were using some KSDB equipment that had been donated after the Nichols Fire.

Recent past
In 1987, KSDB upgraded to a 1,400 watt transmitter which is still in use today. KAKE-TV in Wichita donated a tower for the transmitter. KSDB purchased automation equipment in 1997 which allowed it to broadcast 24 hours per day.

KSDB officially moved into its new studio in the K-State Student Union on July 1, 2002 under the leadership of Candace Walton. The studio was fitted with all-new digital equipment. 
There are litany of people who have attributed to the success of this college radio station. In the spring of  2013, KSDB was awarded 14 undergraduate radio awards, the most awarded to any institution in the state. In the fall of 2015 KSDB moved back to McCain due to the renovations at the K-State Student Union, which is where the main studio and offices remain, while an open mic is set up in the Union Studios.

Changes

KSDB has gone through multiple programming and identity changes throughout its existence.  Due to the transient nature of college radio, students typically commit no more than four years to the station, providing much variance.  Since the early 1980s, KSDB has been known for its diverse programming, which has taken such titles as, “Urban,” “Jam the Box,” “Nights,” and others, which typically aired in the evenings. Along with station programming, the station dropped its longtime moniker of DB92 in favor of the Wildcat 91.9 in the late 1990s. The name was changed yet again to its current 91.9 KSDB in 2014.

KSDB, in its current state, is the product of much recognition including improvement of diverse programs that change with the student body over the years. Programming decisions are made by the program director, who also hires executive staff members (students). Financial and administrative duties like FCC licensing are handled by the station manager. This balance of freedom and oversight has resulted in numerous awards from the Kansas Association of Broadcasters for KSDB students.

Programming

Students have been allowed to make programming decisions since 1999. "Program and content decisions will be made by the executive staff in weekly meetings in which the program director will serve as chair." Current programming features hip hop from 7 PM to 4 AM, jazz from 4 to 6 AM, and alternative for the rest of the day, with a morning talk show on weekdays, and an open mic hour during weekdays at Noon from the K-State Student Union. KSDB sports announcers broadcast home football and basketball games, and most away games, as well as doing Sports Talk Monday through Thursday at 6:00pm. There are also several specialty shows that take place throughout the week that play different genres of music like metal and local music, or talk shows discussing movies, amongst other things.

Currently on KSDB, national news reports are aired from NBC News Radio, and local reports and weather are read by the DJ on air during weekdays.

From its earliest days, KSDB has built its programming around music, talk, and sports. By the late 1950s, programming for KSDB had expanded to include adaptations of novels, children's programs, and interviews with movie-goers directly from theaters. In 1952, KSDB was the only station to broadcast K-State's basketball games in the West.

The station has also hosted public affairs programs through the years, such as "Kat's Eye" and "A Purple Affair."

KSDB-TV is a closed circuit television station broadcast to K-State through the on-campus cable system on channel 25. Currently, KSDB-TV airs a simulcast of radio programming.

Notable alumni
 Gordon Jump, TV actor and Maytag Man
 Mitch Holthus, voice of the Kansas City Chiefs
 Craig Bolerjack, voice of the Utah Jazz and NCAA college basketball announcer
 Steve Physioc, formerly play-by-play announcer for the local telecasts of Los Angeles Angels of Anaheim baseball games and now announcer on Fox Sports Kansas City and the Royals Radio Network for the Kansas City Royals baseball club.

References

External links

Independent Public Radio
Kansas State University
SDB-FM
Radio stations established in 1949
1949 establishments in Kansas